The Weyburn Regiment was an infantry regiment of the Non-Permanent Active Militia of the Canadian Militia (now the Canadian Army). The regiment was created in 1924 in Weyburn, Saskatchewan, from the reorganization of The South Saskatchewan Regiment into 5 separate regiments. In 1936, The Weyburn Regiment was amalgamated with The Saskatchewan Border Regiment to re-form The South Saskatchewan Regiment.

History
On March 15, 1920, as a result of the Canadian Militia reforms following the Otter Commission, the 95th Saskatchewan Rifles amalgamated with the 60th Rifles of Canada and was renamed as The South Saskatchewan Regiment.

On 15 May 1924, The South Saskatchewan Regiment was reorganized into five separate regiments: The Regina Rifle Regiment, The Assiniboia Regiment (now the 10th Field Artillery Regiment, RCA), The Weyburn Regiment, The Saskatchewan Border Regiment, and The South Saskatchewan Regiment (later redesignated on 15 September 1924, as The King's Own Rifles of Canada and now The Saskatchewan Dragoons).

On 15 December 1936, as a result of the 1936 Canadian Militia reorganization, The Weyburn Regiment was amalgamated with The Saskatchewan Border Regiment to form The South Saskatchewan Regiment.

The South Saskatchewan Regiment would later go on to serve as part of the 2nd Canadian Infantry Division during the Second World War, most notably during the Dieppe Raid of August 1942 and later during the Normandy Campaign of 1944.

Perpetuations 

 152nd Battalion, CEF

Organization 
The Weyburn Regiment had its regimental headquarters at Weyburn, and companies at Weyburn, Arcola, Carlyle and Osage.

Alliances 
Until 1936, The Weyburn Regiment was allied to The Royal Warwickshire Regiment.

Battle honours

Great War 

 Arras 1917
 Hill 70

References 

The March of the Prairie Men. A Story of the South Saskatchewan Regiment by Lt. Col. G. B. Buchanan (1900)

Infantry regiments of Canada
Military units and formations of Saskatchewan
Military units and formations established in 1924
1924 establishments in Saskatchewan
Weyburn
Military units and formations disestablished in 1936
South Saskatchewan Regiment